Communist China may refer to:
People's Republic of China (PRC), the modern state known as "China"
Chinese Communist Party (CCP)
Communist-controlled China (1927–1949)
Chinese Soviet Republic (CSR)
History of the People's Republic of China